Meonis is a genus of beetles in the family Carabidae, containing the following species:

 Meonis uncinatus Baehr, 2007
 Meonis amplicollis Sloane, 1915
 Meonis angusticollis Sloane, 1911
 Meonis angustior Baehr, 2007
 Meonis ater Castelnau, 1867
 Meonis carteri Baehr, 2007
 Meonis convexus Sloane, 1900
 Meonis cordicollis Baehr, 2007
 Meonis interruptus Baehr, 2007
 Meonis magnus Baehr, 2007
 Meonis minor Sloane, 1916
 Meonis niger Castelnau, 1867
 Meonis quinquesulcatus Baehr, 2007
 Meonis semistriatus Sloane, 1916
 Meonis styx Baehr, 2007
 Meonis subconvexus Baehr, 2007

References

Psydrinae
Taxa named by François-Louis Laporte, comte de Castelnau